LTU may refer to:

Universities 
La Trobe University, university in Australia
Lawrence Technological University, university in Southfield, Michigan
Ling Tung University, university in Taichung, Taiwan
Louisiana Tech University, university in Ruston, Louisiana
Luleå University of Technology, university in Sweden

Companies 
LTU International, former German airline acquired by Air Berlin
LTU Technologies, software company

Other 
ISO 639:ltu or Latu language, an Austronesian language spoken in Indonesia
Land treatment unit, term in bioremediation
Licence to use, type of intellectual property licence
LTU Austria (LTU Billa Lufttransport Unternehmen GmbH), a former airline in Vienna, Austria
LTU-Arena, former name of Merkur Spiel-Arena in Düsseldorf, Germany
Littoisten Työväen Urheilijat, a sports club from Littoinen, Finland
IATA code for Latur Airport, India
LTU, the IOC country code for Lithuania
LTU, the ISO 3166-1 alpha-3 country code for Lithuania, used by FIFA

See also
LT (disambiguation)